Mohamed Shifan is a Sri Lankan footballer who plays as a forward for Sri Lanka Champions League club Up Country Lions and the Sri Lanka national team.

References

External links
 
 

Living people
Sri Lankan footballers
Sri Lanka international footballers
Association football forwards
Sri Lanka Football Premier League players
Year of birth missing (living people)